Re-Constriction 10* Year Anniversary is a various artists compilation album released in 1996 by Re-Constriction Records. Sonic Boom commended the collection and claimed "once again the perverse humor of the resident label slumlord has made its way into his product."

Track listing

Personnel
Adapted from the Re-Constriction 10* Year Anniversary liner notes.

 Steven Seibold – mastering

Release history

References

External links 
 Re-Constriction 10* Year Anniversary at Discogs (list of releases)

1996 compilation albums
Electro-industrial compilation albums
Re-Constriction Records compilation albums